John Smyth (1776 – 1840) was an Irish sculptor. 

The son of sculptor Edward Smyth (1749–1812), John Smyth was trained at the Dublin Society's school, and worked with his father at Montgomery Street (now Foley Street) in Dublin. 

One of his first public works was a monument to John Ball in St Patrick's Cathedral, Dublin.

He assisted his father, Edward, with a number of sculptures at Parliament House (now Bank of Ireland), the King's Inns, and with decorative plaster and stonework at the Chapel Royal of Dublin Castle. He also sculpted the statues of Mercury, Fidelity, and Hibernia for the pediment of the General Post Office, Dublin (c.1814).

He repaired the equestrian statue of William III (William of Orange) in College Green after it was blown up in 1836. Other pieces by John Smyth were sculpted for Dublin's Richmond Bridge (c.1816; now O'Donovan Rossa Bridge), and several public buildings and churches in the capital. In 1818, Smyth was commissioned to produce a bust of Charles Whitworth, 1st Earl Whitworth, then Lord Lieutenant of Ireland, which was displayed at the Society of Artists in 1819 alongside a bust of his wife Arabella by Thomas Kirk. A number of his works are held by the National Gallery of Ireland. Like his own father, several of John Smyth's own children become sculptors, as did his grandchildren.

References

1770s births
1840 deaths
Irish sculptors